This article presents a list of the historical events and publications of Australian literature during 1913.

Books 

 Louis Becke — Bully Hayes: Buccaneer, and Other Stories
 James Francis Dwyer — The Spotted Panther
Vera Dwyer — With Beating Wings
 Mary Gaunt — Every Man's Desire
 Henry Lawson — Triangles of Life and Other Stories
 Norman Lindsay — A Curate in Bohemia
 Louise Mack
 Attraction
 The Marriage of Edward
 Dorothea Mackellar — Outlaw's Luck
 Ambrose Pratt
 The Golden Kangaroo
 Wolaroi's Cup
 Louis Stone — Betty Wayside
 Ethel Turner — The Secret of the Sea
 Lilian Turner — Stairways to the Stars

Poetry 

 Arthur H. Adams — The Collected Verses of Arthur H. Adams
 Christopher Brennan
 Poems (1913)
 "The Wanderer"
 John Le Gay Brereton — "The Robe of Grass"
 Ada Cambridge — The Hand in the Dark and Other Poems
 C. J. Dennis
 Backblock Ballads and Other Verses
 "The Bridge Across the Crick"
 "Spring Song of a Bloke"
 "Wheat"
 Mary Gilmore — "The Sea-Sleep"
 Grant Hervey — Australian Yet and Other Verses
 Henry Lawson — For Australia and Other Poems
 Hugh McCrae — "Song of the Rain"
 John Shaw Neilson — "Song Be Delicate"
 Will H. Ogilvie — The Overlander and Other Verses
 Bertram Stevens and George Mackaness eds.
 The Children's Treasury of Australian Verse
 Selections from the Australian Poets

Births 

A list, ordered by date of birth (and, if the date is either unspecified or repeated, ordered alphabetically by surname) of births in 1913 of Australian literary figures, authors of written works or literature-related individuals follows, including year of death.

 19 January — Rex Ingamells, poet (died 1955)
 20 February – Mary Durack, novelist (died 1994)
 6 May — Douglas Stewart, poet (died 1985)
 30 July — John Blight, poet (died 1995)
 2 August — Nancy Phelan, novelist (died 2008)
 25 September — Kenneth Mackenzie, poet and novelist (died 1955)
 11 December — Mungo Ballardie MacCallum, journalist and novelist (died 1999)

Unknown date
 Elizabeth O'Conner, novelist (died 2000)

Deaths 

A list, ordered by date of death (and, if the date is either unspecified or repeated, ordered alphabetically by surname) of deaths in 1913 of Australian literary figures, authors of written works or literature-related individuals follows, including year of birth.

 3 January — Garnet Walch, writer, dramatist, journalist and publisher (born 1843)
 18 February — Louis Becke, short story writer and novelist (born 1855)
 4 June — Ambrose Dyson, poet and artist (born 1876)

See also 
 1913 in poetry
 List of years in literature
 List of years in Australian literature
1913 in literature
1912 in Australian literature
1913 in Australia
 1914 in Australian literature

References

Literature
Australian literature by year
20th-century Australian literature